The 2000 Durban Sevens, also known as the 2000 South Africa Sevens, was an international rugby sevens tournament that was the first leg of the 2000–01 World Sevens Series. The tournament, which took place at the ABSA Stadium on 18–19 November 2000, was moved from Stellenbosch to Durban for the 2000–01 and 2001–02 seasons.

The hosts, South Africa, were defeated 19–12 by Australia in the Cup quarterfinals but ended the tournament by beating Samoa 22–12 in the Plate final whilst defending World Sevens Series champions New Zealand defeated defending South Africa Sevens champions Fiji 34–5 in the Cup final.

Format
The teams were drawn into four pools of four teams each. Each team played the other teams in their pool once, with 3 points awarded for a win, 2 points for a draw, and 1 point for a loss (no points awarded for a forfeit). The pool stage was played on the first day of the tournament. The top two teams from each pool advanced to the Cup/Plate brackets. The bottom two teams from each pool went on to the Bowl bracket. No Shield trophy was on offer in the 2000-01 season.

Teams
Two teams made their IRB Sevens World Series debuts as Wales and Portugal competed for the first time. The 16 participating teams for the tournament:

Pool stage

Pool A

Source: World Rugby

Source: World Rugby

Pool B

Source: World Rugby

Source: World Rugby

Pool C

Source: World Rugby

Source: World Rugby

Pool D

Source: World Rugby

Source: World Rugby

Knockout stage

Bowl

Source: World Rugby

Plate

Source: World Rugby

Cup

Source: World Rugby

Tournament placings

Source: Rugby7.com

References

2000–01 IRB Sevens World Series
2000
2000 in South African rugby union